Miguel Atilio Boccadoro Hernández (26 April 1951 – 27 January 2022), known professionally as Diego Verdaguer (was an Argentine-born Mexican singer.

Biography
Verdaguer played the trumpet and the bandoneón. He was married to the singer Amanda Miguel. His most famous songs are "Volveré", "Corazón de Papel", "Usted Qué Haría", and "La Ladrona". He had a hit in 2009 after a decade of absence with the song "Voy a Conquistarte", written by the Mexican singer-songwriter Joan Sebastián. He had lifetime sales of almost 50 million records.

Verdaguer was born in Buenos Aires on 26 April 1951, and lived in Mexico from 1980 onwards. 

He died from COVID-19 in Los Angeles on 27 January 2022, at the age of 70.

Discography
Studio albums
Volveré (1976)
El pasadiscos (1978)
El secreto callado (1979)
Estoy vivo (1981)
Coco loco (1982)
Simplemente amor (1984)
Estoy celoso (1986)
Sigo vivo (1988)
Lágrimas (1991)
Inolvidable (1999)
Mexicano hasta las Pampas (2009)
Juego de valientes (2012)
Mexicano hasta las Pampas 2 (2014)
Orgánico (2017)
 Corazón Bambino (2019)

Live albums
Siempre fuimos dos with Amanda Miguel (2003)
El mejor show romántico de América with Amanda Miguel (2007)
Mexicanísimos Vol. I with Amanda Miguel (2010)
Mexicanísimos Vol. II with Amanda Miguel (2011)
Pídeme (2011)

Books
Camino al Escenario (2020)

References

External links
Official website
 
 

1951 births
2022 deaths
Argentine emigrants to Mexico
Deaths from the COVID-19 pandemic in California
Mexican male singers
Musicians from Buenos Aires
Naturalized citizens of Mexico